Balkan Bulgarian Airlines was Bulgaria's government-owned flag carrier airline between 1947 and 2002. During the 1970s, the airline became a significant European carrier. The company encountered financial instability following the fall of communism in Central and Eastern Europe. Despite managing to continue operations, following the start of the 21st century and a controversial privatisation, it declared bankruptcy in 2002. Balkan was liquidated in late .

History

Early years 
Bulgaria had a short-lived airline (Bunavad) in 1927, yet the country could not afford investing in modern air transport until after World War II. In 1946, the Ministry of Transport and Communications formed an Administration of Air Communications. Since Bulgaria was regarded as a combatant on the defeated Axis side, the DVS could only contract with France for the supply of several Atelier d'Avions Coulombe Toucan aircraft (French-built versions of the Junkers Ju 52). In interpretation of their delivery, Bulgarian airmen practised by flying the nation's first long-distance flights: to Paris, transporting government officials to peace negotiations, being conducted there. These flights used German-built Ju 52 aircraft (Bulgarian service designation Сова or Sova, = Owl), delivered before the war to the На Негово Величество Въздушни войски [НВВВ] or His majesty's Air Force, and captured during the war from retreating German forces.

DVS officially launched services under the Bulgarian Air Lines name on 29 June 1947 with a Ju 52 flight from Sofia via Plovdiv to Burgas. Other services soon followed. By the close of the year, the DVS had ordered several Soviet-built Lisunov Li-2 variants of the Douglas DC-3 and at least 13 were operated until 1968. The Soviet forces stationed in Bulgaria took interest in DVS, and by late 1947, had taken DVS into joint ownership, as had been done with all airlines of East-European countries formerly allied with Nazi Germany. The resulting airline was called TABSO, an acronym for "Transportno-aviacionno balgaro-savetsko obedinenie" (Bulgarian-Soviet Transport Aviation Corporation). The Ju 52s gradually phased out from service as TABSO re-equipped with Li-2s. These more modern planes allowed the airline to expand services.

The 1950s and 1960s 

Soviet equity in TABSO was reacquired by the Bulgarian government in 1954. The airline with this brand name survived until the end of 1967, often in the shadow of the headline phrase Bulgarian Air Transport. In 1956, TABSO bought its first Ilyushin Il-14 aircraft. These aircraft, along with Li-2s, were deployed on services to seven domestic destinations, including Burgas, Gorna Oryahovitsa, Ruschuk, Plovdiv, Sofia, Stara Zagora and Varna; and international destinations Amsterdam, Athens, Beirut, Belgrade, Berlin, Bucharest, Budapest, Damascus, Frankfurt, Kiev, Moscow, Odessa, Prague, Vienna and Warsaw.

In 1962, it began services with the Ilyushin Il-18; these and the expansion of Bulgaria's inclusive-tour tourism industry began to put the airline's name on the European and world map. The turboprop type crossed the Equator to Kenya and the Atlantic to Peru. By 1967, Antonov An-24s had arrived for domestic and regional flights.
By the mid-1960s, tourism was a major hard currency earner for Bulgaria and TABSO faced home-grown competition. Executives of the Teksim trading company had decided to start their own aviation business which included crop-spraying and inclusive-tour charter airline operations under the name of Булер (Bulair). Despite trying to buy Sud Aviation Caravelle jet airliners, Bulair ended up buying more Il-18s turboprops under heavy Soviet and Bulgarian political pressure. These were operated to several Western European countries to bring holiday makers to Bulgarian resorts.

The Teksim venture proved a success and a thorn in the side of TABSO. By 1967, TABSO had the inside track in government circles, and the Teksim operation was largely disbanded by 1970. Amid rumours of scandal and embezzling several Teksim directors were sent to jail, accused of performing capitalism-ruled economic behaviour. Their venture had operated under the TABSO banner for reasons of expediency (not least international rights). The last Bulair-branded aircraft had been rebranded as TABSO machines by 1972.

The carrier bought three Tupolev Tu-134 jets in late 1967. On 1 January 1968, TABSO was rebranded Balkan Bulgarian Airlines. The wider commercial aviation scene was put under Balkan's control via subsidiaries such as the aforementioned Bulair, Селскостопанска авиация [ССА] or Selskostopanska aviacia [SSA] (the Agricultural Aviation Company) and a separate profit centre which performed ad hoc aviation contracting, mostly with helicopters.

The airline became the first foreign customer of the type, leading to a close association with the Tupolev design bureau that lasted two decades. There were several reasons why Bulgaria was allowed to put a new Soviet type into service ahead of more important Soviet-bloc nations. Andrei Tupolev was President of the Soviet-Bulgarian Society. He had cemented personal links with his Bulgarian counterpart, formidable wartime Resistance figure and Politburo member Tsola Dragoycheva. She lobbied him for delivery preferences in return for campaigning before the Bulgarian authorities to buy his products rather than Western or other Soviet aircraft types. Indeed, Balkan never bought the Ilyushin Il-62 long-range airliner, preferring to misuse its Tu-154s for long-range work. Similarly, it eschewed Ilyushin's Il-86 wide-body despite arguably having the precise role for it on its sea or ski charter flights.

The 1970s 
At , Balkan served  countries in Africa, Asia and Europe plus  domestic destinations. At this time, the fleet included Antonov An-2s, An-10s and An-24Bs, Ilyushin Il-14s and Il-18s, Tupolev Tu-134s, Z-37 Cmelaks and Mil helicopters. Lazar Beloukhov was the general manager. On 18 January 1971, an Ilyushin Il-18 crashed and caught fire while attempting to land at Kloten Airport in fog; only two people survived the crash. During 1971, Balkan was the first airline beyond the USSR borders to operate the Tupolev Tu-134A. On 21 December, the crash of another Il-18 during takeoff left  fatalities.

Again in 1972, this time with the Tupolev Tu-154, the carrier became the first foreign customer to incorporate a new Tupolev aircraft into its fleet. The latter type was deployed first on charter flights, and later on scheduled services. By  the same year, Balkan had two of these aircraft in service. It also launched non-Soviet use of the Tu-154A, Tu-154B, Tu-154B-2 and Tu-154M. Balkan was a useful test-bed for new ideas by the Tupolev bureau. The airline pioneered the use of three-person flightdeck crews on the Tu-154 by removing navigators (flight crew members whom the designers had intentionally inserted into the Tu-134 and Tu-154) between 1972 and 1976. Balkan also removed the Tu-154's concrete ballast trim on which conservative Tupolev engineers had insisted. In the mid-1980s, a team of Bulgarian engineers interlinked the automatic flight control systems of the airline's Tu-154s with OMEGA Navigation System receivers, enabling very accurate automatic long-range overwater navigation. In the 1990s, Balkan was among the first to fit GPS navigation to its Tu-154 fleet.

As the Soviet-bloc economies gradually entered into stagnation in the 1970s, Balkan continued growing apace. By the mid/late 1970s, it was carrying three million passengers a year, more than any Soviet-bloc airline other than some Directorates of Aeroflot. The fleet comprised aforementioned types plus Antonov An-12s for cargo (since late 1969) and Yakovlev Yak-40 regional jets for short-haul routes (since 1974). The comprehensive route system covered Europe, North Africa and the Middle East. With the delivery of more Tu-154s, Balkan opened longer-range routes, including ones to Zimbabwe, Angola and Nigeria in sub-Equatorial Africa, and to Sri Lanka and Vietnam in Southern Asia.

The 1980s 

In 1986, Balkan was restructured as part of a wholesale shakeup of the late Socialist economy in an attempt to make it more productive and manageable. The airline was divorced from functions such as running airports. It had suffered disastrous traffic falls after the Comecon fuel crisis of 1979, when the number of passengers carried collapsed to under a million. By the late 1980s, loads were back up to 1970s levels. Of the three million annual passengers, a third were carried on domestic services, another third on charter flights, and the remaining million on scheduled international routes.

Balkan joined the International Air Transport Association (IATA) in 1988, becoming its 175th member worldwide. On 10 November 1989, Bulgaria's long-ruling leader Todor Zhivkov was removed from power and Bulgaria began moving away from the Soviet bloc. Within a year, Balkan had been restructured yet again, with Hemus Air emerging from within it as a "second force" state-owned airline with mainly domestic and regional flights. Private airlines began to appear, most important among them Singapore-backed Jes Air which launched services to New York and Singapore using Airbus A310s.

The 1990s 

By mid-1991, Balkan had leased two Boeing 767-200ERs from Air France to compete with failing Jes Air on North American and Southern Asian routes. At the same time Balkan acquired four Airbus A320s from Oryx. The Soviet-build types remained in service alongside the new arrivals.

The 1990s were a time of headlong decline at Balkan. The airline suffered in Bulgaria's transition to a market economy. Former managers of state-owned industry began forming private companies to supply the industries they had once managed (at high prices), and yet other private companies to purchase their production (at low prices). The aim was to control both supply and sales, charging high prices and paying low prices to strangle state companies and then privatise them at very low prices. The entire Bulgarian economy was in deep recession. This was due to severe political instability at home and protracted wars and economic sanctions in neighbouring Yugoslavia. These factors upset potential investment and tourism and cut off Bulgaria from many trading partners.

In , Balkan had a fleet of four Airbus A320-200s, three Antonov An-12Fs, fourteen Antonov An-24s, three Boeing 737-500s, two Boeing 767-200ERs, six Ilyushin Il-18s, five Tupolev Tu-134A-3s, fifteen Tupolev Tu-154B-2s and seven Tupolev Tu-154Ms. At this time, the company had 3,889 employees and the route network included 52 destinations. By 1998, Balkan's 767s returned to Air France and the A320s were passed on to other lessees. The Tu-154B fleet was overdue for replacement, and the Tu-154M was aging. Bulgaria's government appeared to pledge some funds for Airbus A310 acquisition so that long-range services could be sustained, but nothing came of this.

Late in 1998, the company was ready to be sold to a holding named Balkan Air, comprising Bulgarian and US investors, but the transaction was later suspended. All through the decade, there had been rumours of investor interest in Balkan. These rumours consistently named Russian and German airline interests which were said to be eager to buy the carrier. There was also lobbying by the airline's managers for a management buyout. Arkia left the consortium once title in the airline was transferred. It was disclosed in 2001 that Balkan had been declared bankrupt months prior to the sale.

2000 and beyond 
At this time, the fleet included three Antonov An-12s; six Antonov An-24Bs and an An-24RV; two Boeing 737-300s and three 737-500s; an Ilyushin Il-18 and an Il-18D; three Let L 410 UVP-Es; and fourteen Tupolev Tu-154Bs and ten Tu-154Ms. These operated services to Abu Dhabi, Accra, Algiers, Amsterdam, Athens, Bahrain, Bangkok, Belgrade, Berlin, Bourgas, Brussels, Budapest, Cairo, Casablanca, Chisinau, Colombo, Copenhagen, Dubai, Frankfurt, Helsinki, Istanbul, Kyiv, Kuwait, Lagos, Larnaca, London, Madrid, Male, Malta, Milan, Moscow, Paris, Prague, Rome, Sofia, Stockholm, Tehran, Tel Aviv, Tripoli, Varna, Vienna, Warsaw and Zürich. The Israeli connection led to difficulties in operating the Arab routes. Its assets seemed to be being sold-off in an asset-stripping manner and by early 2001, Balkan's fleet was not even up to the task of meeting the airline's summer charter commitments, despite taking on some used 737-300s. In , the Zeevi group ceased funding the carrier and initiated legal action against the Bulgarian government over a  million debt. Although the company was grounded and entered receivership, it resumed flying later that year.

Short of cash, in 2002 Balkan's six weekly slots for Heathrow airport were sold to British Airways for  million. In  that year, creditors turned down a restructuring plan and voted for the closure of the airline, which was liquidated. The number of employees at the time of closure was 1,269. Balkan was succeeded as Bulgaria's national carrier by the newly formed Bulgaria Air.

Destinations

Fleet

Until 1990, Balkan's signs were carried both by normal airliners and special government detachment, agricultural aviation, sanitary wings, cargo planes. Here follows the fleet except An-2 /281 pieces/ and Ка-26, as well as civil Mi-8s /17 pieces/, Mi-17 /1 piece/, Mi-2, training L-410s.

Accidents and incidents
, Aviation Safety Network records 15 occurrences and four hijackings for Balkan, and two fatal accidents plus one hijacking for TABSO. Only events that led to fatalities, wrote off the aircraft involved, or both, are presented in the list below.

See also

Transport in Bulgaria

References

External links

 Historical timetables
 Video at AirlineFan

 
Defunct airlines of Bulgaria
Airlines established in 1946
Airlines disestablished in 2002
1946 establishments in Bulgaria
2002 disestablishments in Bulgaria